Xenolepidichthys dalgleishi, the spotted tinselfish, is a species of tinselfish found in deep oceanic waters at depths of from .  This species grows to a length of  TL.  This species is the only known member of its genus.

References
 

Grammicolepididae
Fish described in 1922